The 1951–52 Ohio Bobcats men's basketball team represented Ohio University in the college basketball season of 1951–52. The team was coached by Jim Snyder in his third season as Ohio's head coach.  They played their home games at the Men's Gymnasium. They finished the season 12–12.  They finished fourth in the Mid-American Conference with a conference record of 6–6.

Schedule

|-
!colspan=9 style=| Regular Season

 Source:

Statistics

Team Statistics
Final 1951–52 Statistics

Source

Player statistics

Source

References

Ohio Bobcats men's basketball seasons
Ohio
1951 in sports in Ohio
1952 in sports in Ohio